Kemajl Avdiu (born 22 December 1976) is a Swedish former footballer.

Career

England

Continuing his career at Bury from Esbjerg fB, Avdiu stayed with the Shakers until 2000, totaling 27 appearances and one goal.

Meanwhile, his family was trying to survive the Kosovo War (1998-1999), afraid to leave due to the threat of the Yugoslavian army. His family, including himself supported the NATO bombing of the country, but some of his relatives had not been accounted for, even though most fled to Albania. The then 22-year old, feeling fortunate to be safe, also expressed concern for his Austria-based friend who was thinking of enrolling in the Kosovo Liberation Army.

When the conflict was over, Avdiu hoped that his parents would retire in Kosovo.

Scotland
Loaned out to Partick Thistle from April to May 1999, the Swede put the Jags 2-0 up over East Fife on debut, but they came back 2-2. Despite this, he remained a fans' favorite. The day before, he volunteered to pack supplies to help people affected  by the Kosovo War, expressing disquiet at the situation but also fortunate that there were many volunteers.

References

External links 
 fogis.se Profile 
 at Footballdatabase.eu 
 Soccerbase Profile

1976 births
Living people
Swedish footballers
Swedish people of Kosovan descent
Association football wingers
Association football forwards
Swedish expatriate footballers
Expatriate men's footballers in Denmark
Expatriate footballers in England
Expatriate footballers in Scotland
Expatriate association footballers in the Republic of Ireland
Expatriate footballers in Greece
Esbjerg fB players
Bury F.C. players
Partick Thistle F.C. players
Falkirk F.C. players
Finn Harps F.C. players
Jönköpings Södra IF players
PAS Giannina F.C. players
Husqvarna FF players
FC Trollhättan players